is a Japanese anime television series produced by Fuji TV, Asmik Ace, Sony Music Entertainment Japan, Dentsu, Bones, and Kinema Citrus. It first aired on Fuji TV's noitamina timeslot in july 2009, running for 11 episodes until September. The anime was directed by Masaki Tachibana, with Natsuko Takahashi handling series composition, Atsuko Nozaki designing the characters and Kow Otani composing the music. The series centers on two young siblings, Mirai and Yūki, and single mother Mari who the two meet in the aftermath of a major earthquake hitting the Japanese capital, placed in the near future.

In 2009, Tokyo Magnitude 8.0 won the Excellence Award at the 13th Japan Media Arts Festival.

Plot
After a massive earthquake in Tokyo 25 km under the sea at a magnitude of 8.0, two young siblings Mirai and Yūki, who were visiting a robot exhibition in Odaiba at the beginning of their summer vacation, struggle to reach their parents in their house in Setagaya, assisted by a female motorcycle courier named Mari, who is striving to reach her own daughter and mother in Sangenjaya. Together, the three of them brave the partly ruined city and try their best to make it home safely.

Characters
  is a 7th grader who attends Rika Girls Academy. At the beginning of the series, she is unsure of what she wants to become later in life, but starts to change this outlook after the earthquake. 
  is a 3rd grader and enthusiastic about robots. He has a somewhat distant relationship with his sister, and does not like to let others know when he is tired or ill. 
  is a motorcycle courier who assists Mirai and Yūki reach their parents' home after the earthquake happens. They make a promise to reach their home together. 
 , Mirai and Yūki's father, is injured while at work when the earthquake occurs. 
  is Mirai and Yūki's mother. The earthquake occurs on her birthday. 
  is one of Mirai's friends from school. She is seen taking care of her younger siblings while her mother is in a nearby hospital. 
  is Mirai's other friend from school. Because of her laziness she tends to do poorly in her studies. 
  another classmate of Mirai's. She comes from a rich family and owns a summer house in Canada that was built by her father. 
  is Yuki's best friend who is in the same class as him. Before the earthquake, he and Yuki along with their school teacher planted a tree in their school's yard.  
  is Mari's daughter age 3 to 5 years old. While Hina's mother was out searching for her, she was staying with her grandmother during the earthquake. 
  is a middle school boy who becomes friends with Mirai in episode 7. Just like Yuki he is a big fan of robots. 
 Aya Kawasaki is Mari's co-worker at Tiger Express Delivery who helps take care of her when she arrives at the office.

Production and release

The series was first announced at the 2009 Tokyo Anime Fair, denoting that it would replace Eden of the East in Fuji TV's noitamina well-rated anime timeblock and would be co-produced by Bones and Kinema Citrus. It first aired on Fuji TV's noitamina timeslot on July 9, 2009, running for 11 episodes until September 17. The series' setting is based upon the prediction that there is 70% or higher chance of an earthquake measuring 7.0 magnitude on the Richter scale hitting Tokyo in the next 30 years, with the series illustrating the consequences of a magnitude 8.0 earthquake affecting the city. Bones stated that it would try to realistically depict the after-effects of such a situation and that it would collect and tabulate research on previous earthquakes and interview individuals who were affected by them.

The series features the efforts of the Japan Ground Self-Defense Force, Japan Coast Guard, Tokyo Fire Department and Tokyo Disaster Medical Assistance Team in assisting recovery efforts after the initial earthquake and its recurring aftershocks. FNN newscaster Christel Takigawa also features as a guest, reporting on the earthquake and assuming the role of a "navigator" during the series.

The series uses two pieces of theme music.  by Abingdon Boys School is used for the opening theme, while "M/elody" by Shion Tsuji is used for the ending.
This series was broadcast only in Italy on Italian television channel Rai 4 on August 22, 2011, and ended September 5, 2011 for a time ranging from 10.45am and 11.00am.

Episode list

Reception
Tokyo Magnitude 8.0 won the Excellence Award in the Animation Division at the 13th Japan Media Arts Festival in 2009.

See also 
 2011 Tōhoku earthquake and tsunami – one of the largest in the history of observations of magnitude 9.0.

Notes

References

External links

2009 anime television series debuts
2009 Japanese television series endings
Anime with original screenplays
Bones (studio)
Drama anime and manga
Fiction set in 2012
Fiction with unreliable narrators
Japanese disaster films
Kinema Citrus
Maiden Japan
Noitamina
Works about earthquakes